{{Infobox ethnic group
| group    = East Asian Canadians
| image    = 
| caption  = 
| pop      = 2,289,8056.3% of the total Canadian population (2021)
| popplace = Southern Ontario, Southwestern BC, Central Alberta, Montreal, Most urban areas
| langs    = Canadian EnglishCanadian French

East Asian Canadians are Canadians who were either born in or can trace their ancestry to East Asia. The term East Asian Canadian is a subgroup of Asian Canadians. According to Statistics Canada, East Asian Canadians are considered visible minorities and can be further divided by ethnicity and/or nationality, such as Chinese Canadian, Hong Kong Canadian, Japanese Canadian, Korean Canadian, Mongolian Canadian, Taiwanese Canadian, or Tibetan Canadian, as seen on demi-decadal census data.

According to the 2021 Canadian census, 2,289,805 Canadians had East Asian geographical origins, constituting 6.3 percent of the total population and 31.2 percent of the total Asian Canadian population. Additionally as of 2021, East Asians comprise the third largest pan-ethnic group in Canada after Europeans (69.8 percent) and South Asians (7.1 percent).

Terminology 

East Asian Canadians are typically identified under the term "Asian"; popular usage of this term in Canada generally excludes both West and South Asians, instead solely referring to individuals of East Asian or Southeast Asian ancestry.

History

18th century 
The first record of East Asians in what is known as Canada today can be dated back to 1788 when renegade British Captain John Meares hired a group of Chinese carpenters from Macau and employed them to build a ship at Nootka Sound, Vancouver Island, British Columbia. After the outpost was seized by Spanish forces, the eventual whereabouts of the carpenters was largely unknown.

19th century 
In the mid-late 19th century, early settlers from East Asia (China and Japan) emigrated to Canada, predominantly settling in British Columbia.

During the mid-19th century, many Chinese arrived to take part in the British Columbia gold rushes. Beginning in 1858, early settlers formed Victoria's Chinatown and other Chinese communities in New Westminster, Yale and Lillooet. Estimates indicate that about 1/3 of the non-native population of the Fraser goldfields was Chinese. Later, the construction of the Canadian Pacific Railway prompted another wave of immigration from the East Asian country. Mainly hailing from Guangdong Province, the Chinese helped build the Canadian Pacific Railway through the Fraser Canyon.

Many Japanese people also arrived in Canada during the mid to late 19th century and became fishermen and merchants in British Columbia. Early immigrants from the East Asian island nation most notably worked in canneries such as Steveston along the pacific coast.

By 1884, Nanaimo, New Westminster, Yale and Victoria had the largest Chinese populations in the province. Other settlements such as Quesnelle Forks were majority Chinese and many early immigrants from the East Asian country settled on Vancouver Island, most notably in Cumberland. In addition to work on the railway, most Chinese in the late 19th century British Columbia lived among other Chinese and worked in market gardens, coal mines, sawmills, and salmon canneries.

In 1885, soon after the construction on the railway was completed, the federal government passed the Chinese Immigration Act, whereby the government began to charge a substantial head tax for each Chinese person trying to immigrate to Canada. A decade later, the fear of the "Yellow Peril" prompted the government of Mackenzie Bowell to pass an act forbidding any East Asian Canadian from voting or holding office.

Many Chinese workers settled in Canada after the railway was constructed, however most could not bring the rest of their families, including immediate relatives, due to government restrictions and enormous processing fees. They established Chinatowns and societies in undesirable sections of the cities, such as  East Pender Street in Vancouver, which had been the focus of the early city's red-light district until Chinese merchants took over the area from the 1890s onwards.

20th century 
Immigration restrictions stemming from anti-Asian sentiment in Canada continued during the early 20th century. Parliament voted to increase the Chinese head tax to $500 dollars in 1902; this temporarily caused Chinese immigration to Canada to stop. However, in following years, Chinese immigration to Canada recommenced as many saved up money to pay the head tax. 

Heightened anti-Asian sentiment resulted in the infamous anti-Asian pogrom in Vancouver in 1907. Spurred by similar riots in Bellingham targeting Punjabi Sikh South Asian settlers, The Asiatic Exclusion League organized attacks against homes and businesses owned by East Asian immigrants under the slogan "White Canada Forever!"; though no one was killed, much property damage was done and numerous East Asian Canadians (Chinese-Canadians and Japanese-Canadians) were beaten up.

In 1923, the federal government passed the Chinese Immigration Act of 1923, which banned all Chinese immigration, and led to immigration restrictions for all East Asians. In 1947, the act was repealed.

The second world war prompted the federal government used the War Measures Act to brand Japanese Canadians enemy aliens and categorized them as security threats in 1942. Tens of thousands of Japanese Canadians were placed in internment camps in British Columbia; prison of war camps in Ontario; and families were also sent as forced labourers to farms throughout the prairies. By 1943, all properties owned by Japanese Canadians in British Columbia were seized and sold without consent.

Unlike Korean Americans who have relatively much longer history settling in the United States, very few settled in Canada; as late as 1965, the total permanent Korean population of Canada was estimated at only 70. However, with the 1966 reform of Canadian immigration laws, South Korean immigration to Canada began to grow. By 1969, there were an estimated 2000 Koreans in Canada.

In the late 1990s, South Korea became the fifth-largest source of immigrants to Canada. Toronto has the country's largest absolute number of Koreans, but Vancouver is experiencing the highest rate of growth in its Korean population, with a 69% increase since 1996. Montreal was the third most popular destination for Korean migrants during this period.The 1990s growth in South Korean migration to Canada occurred at a time when Canadian unemployment was high and income growth was low relative to the United States. One pair of researchers demonstrated that numbers of migrants were correlated with the exchange rate; the weakness of the Canadian dollar relative to the United States dollar meant that South Korean migrants bringing savings to Canada for investment would be relatively richer than those going to the United States. Other factors suggested as drivers behind the growth of South Korean immigration to Canada included domestic anti-Americanism and the large presence of Canadian English teachers in local hagwon.

When Hong Kong reverted to mainland Chinese rule, people emigrated and found new homes in Canada.

Demography

Ethnic and national origins

Geographical distribution

Provinces & territories

See also 
 Chinese Canadians
 Korean Canadians
 Japanese Canadians
 Mongolian Canadians
 Tibetan Canadians
 Hong Kong Canadians
 Taiwanese Canadians
 Asian Canadians

Notes

References

Sources 

Ethnic groups in Canada
Canadian people of Asian descent
East Asian Canadian
Asian Canadian